Khalaf Al-Hosani (Arabic:خلف الحوسني; born 23 February 1996) is an Emirati footballer. He currently plays as a left back for Khor Fakkan.

External links

References

Emirati footballers
1996 births
Living people
Al Dhafra FC players
Hatta Club players
Khor Fakkan Sports Club players
UAE Pro League players
Association football fullbacks